The 2022 Internationaux de Tennis de Troyes was a professional tennis tournament played on clay courts. It was the first edition of the tournament which was part of the 2022 ATP Challenger Tour. It took place in Troyes, France between 27 June and 3 July 2022. The first edition was originally supposed to be held in 2020 but was canceled due to the COVID-19 pandemic.

Singles main draw entrants

Seeds

 1 Rankings as of 20 June 2022.

Other entrants
The following players received wildcards into the singles main draw:
  Arthur Fils
  Abel Hernández Aguila
  Luca Van Assche

The following player received entry into the singles main draw using a protected ranking:
  Joris De Loore

The following players received entry into the singles main draw as alternates:
  Pedro Boscardin Dias
  Tristan Lamasine

The following players received entry from the qualifying draw:
  Adrian Andreev
  Andrey Chepelev
  Francesco Maestrelli
  Matteo Martineau
  Jakub Paul
  Clément Tabur

Champions

Singles 

  Juan Bautista Torres def.  Benjamin Hassan 7–6(7–2), 6–2.

Doubles 

  Íñigo Cervantes /  Oriol Roca Batalla def.  Thiago Agustín Tirante /  Juan Bautista Torres 6–1, 6–2.

References

Internationaux de Tennis de Troyes
Internationaux de Tennis de Troyes
June 2022 sports events in France
July 2022 sports events in France